Nunukan is an island within the Nunukan Regency in North Kalimantan Province of Indonesia.

See also
List of islands of Indonesia

Islands of Kalimantan
Landforms of North Kalimantan